Zachary Ellis-Hayden (born March 1, 1992) is a Canadian soccer player who currently plays as a defender for Guelph United FC in League1 Ontario.

Club career
In 2015, he began his career with K-W United FC in the USL Premier Development League. For the remainder of the season, he played in the Canadian Soccer League Second Division with SC Waterloo B. He also managed to play with Waterloo's senior team in the First Division and was featured in the CSL Championship final against Toronto Croatia. He also played college soccer with Cleveland State University from 2010 till 2013.

Ellis-Hayden was acquired by Orlando City B in February 2016. In November 2016, Orlando City B announced that they had re-signed Cox for the 2017 season. After the 2017 season, Orlando City B announced they would not pick up Ellis Hayden's option for the following season.

On December 21, 2017, it was announced that Ellis-Hayden would join Fresno FC ahead of their inaugural season in the United Soccer League.

Following Fresno FC folding, Ellis-Hayden made the move to USL Championship club Oklahoma City Energy. In December 2021, Oklahoma City Energy would announce that they would go on hiatus for the 2022 season, ending his time with the club after two seasons.

Ellis-Hayden moved to League1 Ontario expansion club Electric City FC in February 2022. He was named a league Third Team All-Star in 2022.

In March 2023, he signed with Guelph United FC.

International career
Born in Canada, Ellis-Hayden accepted a call-up to Barbados in May 2022 ahead of their CONCACAF Nations League matches against Antigua and Barbuda, Cuba and Guadeloupe. However, he suffered an injury in training ahead of the matches and departed the squad.

References

External links
Cleveland State bio
Orlando City B bio

1992 births
Living people
Association football defenders
Canadian soccer players
Canadian expatriate soccer players
SC Waterloo Region players
K-W United FC players
Orlando City B players
Fresno FC players
OKC Energy FC players
Cleveland State Vikings men's soccer players
Soccer people from Ontario
Sportspeople from Kitchener, Ontario
Expatriate soccer players in the United States
USL Championship players
USL League Two players
Canadian Soccer League (1998–present) players
Electric City FC players